Blott en dag  is an album by the Swedish singer Carola Häggkvist. It was released on 21 October 1998 in Sweden and Norway. The album consists of Christian hymns written by Lina Sandell.

The title comes from the lead song. "Blott en dag" by Lina Sandell (words, 1865) and Oscar Ahnfelt (music, 1872) was translated into English as "Day by Day" by Andrew Skoog in 1921.

Track listing
Blott en dag
Jag är en gäst och främling
Är det sant att Jesus är min broder
Modersvingen
O Jesu, öppna du mitt öga
Jesus för världen givit sitt liv
Gör det lilla du kan
Tryggare kan ingen vara
Aldrig är jag utan fara
Jag kan icke räkna dem alla
Herrens nåd är var morgon ny
Bred dina vida vingar

Charts

Release history

References

1998 albums
Carola Häggkvist albums